Lütf-ü Hümayun was an unprotected cruiser of the Ottoman Navy.

Ordered in 1880, the construction of the ship started in 1882 at the Tersâne-i Âmire shipyard in Istanbul. She was launched on 16 August 1892. Sea trials were conducted in July 1896. In October 1896, she was commissioned in Istanbul as a stationary training ship. In 1905, her guns, machinery and masts were dismantled. Plans to rebuild her in Istanbul by Ansaldo did not materialize. Decommissioned in 1908, she was sold for scrap in November 1909.

Design 
Lutf-ü Hümayun was 64 metres long, 9.1 metres wide and had a draft of 3.9 metres. She displaced 1313 tons. The ship was built with a composite of iron and wood. She was a scaled-down version of the design of her half-sister . She had a single chimney.

The ship was powered by a single vertical triple expansion steam engine with three cylinders turning a screw. Built by Tersane-i Amire, the engine  received its steam from coal-fired boilers. The engine was capable of producing . She had a coal capacity of 205 tons.

The ship's original design included four 170 mm L/25 QF Krupp guns, six 120 mm L/25 QF Krupp guns, four 47 mm QF Hotchkiss guns, six machine guns and two 450 mm torpedo tubes. When she entered service in 1896, she carried three 170 mm L/25 QF Krupp guns forward, six 120 mm L/25 QF Krupp guns, six 47 mm QF Hotchkiss guns and two 450 mm torpedo tubes on sponsons amidships. In 1899 her armament was changed to two 150 mm L/40 QF Krupp guns, two 120 mm L/25 QF Krupp guns, four 37 mm QF guns, two 450 mm torpedo tubes. In 1905 her guns were dismantled.

Service history
The construction of Lütf-ü Hümayun ordered in 1880 started in 1882 at Tersâne-i Âmire. She was launched on 16 August 1892 after ten years of construction and after four years of outfitting, sea trials were conducted in July 1896. She entered service in October 1896. She spent her career as a stationary training ship in Istanbul. In 1905, her guns, machinery and masts were dismantled. Although she was planned to be rebuilt by Ansaldo in Istanbul, this did not happen. Decommissioned in 1908, she was sold as scrap for dismantling in November 1909. Her dismantling lasted until 1921.

Footnotes

References
 
 
 

1892 ships
Cruisers of the Ottoman Navy